The twenty-fourth season of the American animated television series The Simpsons began airing on Fox on September 30, 2012, and concluded on May 19, 2013.

Advertising revenue
An August 2011 article in Advertising Age reported that the average cost of a 30-second advertising spot during a first-run episode of The Simpsons was $286,131—up from $254,260 in season 23. In 2012, The Simpsons was the sixth-most expensive television series in the United States to sponsor. The top five were (in ascending order) American Idol (Thursday), New Girl, Modern Family, American Idol (Wednesday), and NBC Sunday Night Football. A first-run, season 24 episode of The Simpsons was the Fox Broadcasting Company's fourth-most expensive program to sponsor, up from fifth in 2011.

Episodes

References

Bibliography

Simpsons season 24
2012 American television seasons
2013 American television seasons